The Mote and the Beam is a parable of Jesus given in the Sermon on the Mount in the Gospel of Matthew, chapter 7, verses . The discourse is fairly brief, and begins by warning his followers of the dangers of judging others, stating that they too would be judged by the same standard.

Narrative
The New Testament text is as follows:

The first two verses use plural "ye" and "you", and the next three verses use the singular "thou", "thy" and "thine" to the individual.

Interpretation

The moral lesson is to avoid hypocrisy, self-righteousness, and censoriousness. The analogy used is of a small object in another's eye as compared with a large beam of wood in one's own. The original Greek word translated as "mote" ( karphos) meant "any small dry body". The terms mote and beam are from the King James Version; other translations use different words, e.g. the New International Version uses "speck (of sawdust)" and "plank". In 21st century English a "mote" is more normally a particle of dust – particularly one that is floating in the air – rather than a tiny splinter of wood. The analogy is suggestive of a carpenter's workshop, with which Jesus would have been familiar.

In the analogy, the one seeking to remove the impediment in the eye of his brother has the larger impediment in his own eye, suggesting metaphorically that the one who attempts to regulate his brother often displays the greater blindness and hypocrisy.

A proverb of this sort was familiar to the Jews, and appears in numerous other cultures too, such as the Latin proverb of later Roman days referenced by Athenagoras of Athens, meretrix pudicam.

Mindfulness and Non-resistance Interpretation 
Eckhart Tolle interprets Jesus Christ's teachings as being centred around Mindfulness and Acceptance. In The Power of Now: A Guide to Spiritual Enlightenment Tolle says:To relinquish judgment does not mean that you do not recognize dysfunction and unconsciousness when you see it. It means "being the knowing" rather than "being the reaction'' and the judge. You will then either be totally free of reaction or you may react and still be the knowing, the space in which the reaction is watched and allowed to be. Instead of fighting the darkness, you bring in the light. Instead of reacting to delusion, you see the delusion yet at the same time look through it. Being the knowing creates a clear space of loving presence that allows all things and all people to be as they are. No greater catalyst for transformation exists.Relinquishing judgement is, in this sense, about not imbuing reality with dualistic concepts that distract you from the singular reality of the present moment. To judge something as good or bad is to enter into the world of dualities, and this creates psychological, or spiritual, tension. This is how Tolle interprets "Judge not, that ye be not judged", because if you categorise something or someone negatively or positively, you affirm that its opposite polarity must also exist, and so resistance, conflict, suffering, sin, become possible.

See also

Jesus and the woman taken in adultery
Physician, heal thyself
The pot calling the kettle black
Great Commandment

Notes

References

Further reading

Hypocrisy
Judgment in Christianity
Parables of Jesus
Sermon on the Mount